Youngcane Creek is a stream in the U.S. state of Georgia.

The stream was named after Young Cane, the son of Long Cane, a Cherokee chieftain. Variant names are "Pine Log Creek" and "Young Cane Creek".

References

Rivers of Georgia (U.S. state)
Rivers of Union County, Georgia